Joseph Pemberton (1852–1926) was a British rosarian, remembered for creating the hybrid musk class of cultivated roses.

Career
The Reverend Joseph Hardwick Pemberton was born in 1852 in The Round House, Havering-atte-Bower, Romford, Essex; he lived there with his sister Florence until his death in 1926. He was an Anglican clergyman for more than 30 years. A keen amateur rose grower, he joined the Royal National Rose Society shortly after its founding, and in 1911 served as its president. After his retirement in 1914, Pemberton turned to rose breeding in an attempt to recreate the "Grandmother's roses" he recalled from childhood. He set up Pemberton Nursery at Romford and nearby where eventually  some 35–40,000 roses were grown annually for sale. All the roses of the Pemberton Nursery were bequeathed to their gardeners, who at Romford were Jack and Ann Bentall. They released several new roses after Pemberton's death.

Rose breeding
Using the climber 'Trier' (descended from 'Aglaia', itself an 1896 cross by Peter Lambert using Rosa multiflora), Pemberton crossed it with hybrid tea roses to produce a class of highly scented, generally cluster-flowered roses which remain popular garden material to this day. Initially he classed them also as hybrid teas, but later took to referring to them as 'hybrid musks', based upon a tenuous link between 'Trier' and Rosa moschata.

Pemberton also bred a number of more conventional hybrid teas, and several Multiflora ramblers still worth growing.

Hybrid Musks reached their apogee well after Pemberton's death. Reimer Kordes' universally grown 'Schneewittchen' ('Iceberg') of 1958 was bred from Pemberton's 'Robin Hood'.

Selected Pemberton roses
Of the roses on the following list, 'Buff Beauty' is thought to have been bred by Pemberton but was actually introduced by Ann Bentall in 1939, some 13 years after Pemberton's death. 'Ballerina' was likewise introduced by her in 1937.

References

Rose breeders
1852 births
1926 deaths